The seventh All-Africa Games were held in September 1999 in Johannesburg, South Africa. As the track is at an altitude of 1748 metres all performances are considered to be set at altitude, this is believed to assist events up to 400 metres and in the long jump and triple jump.  However, for events beyond 800 metres the thinner air is believed to have a detrimental effect on performances.

Maria de Lurdes Mutola of Mozambique won her third 800 metres title in a row. Nigeria won all four relay races; 4 × 100 metres and 4 × 400 metres for men and women. South African athletes won all four throwing events for men.

Some new women's events were added: pole vault, hammer throw and 10 kilometres road walk.

Medal summary

Men's events

Women's events

Medal table

Participating nations

See also
1999 in athletics (track and field)

External links
GBR Athletics

 
Athletics
1999
All-Africa Games
1999 All-Africa Games